Àlex Corretja Verdegay (born 11 April 1974) is a Spanish former professional tennis player. During his career, he was twice a major runner-up at the French Open (in 1998 and 2001), won the Tour Finals in 1998, reached a career-high singles ranking of world No. 2 in 1999, and captured Masters 1000 titles at the 1997 Italian Open and 2000 Indian Wells Masters. Corretja also played a key role in helping Spain win its first Davis Cup title in 2000.

Alex Corretja, Dominik Hrbaty and Novak Djokovic are the only players to have a winning record over Roger Federer and Rafael Nadal.

Post-retirement, Corretja became a temporary coach of Andy Murray in April 2008 for the duration of the clay-court season, resuming the role on a permanent basis between 2009 and 2011. From 2012 to 2013, Corretja coached the Spanish Davis Cup team.

Career

Corretja was born in Barcelona, and first came to the tennis world's attention as a promising junior player who won the Orange Bowl under-16 title in 1990. He turned professional in 1991 and won his first top-level singles title in 1994 at Buenos Aires. His first doubles title came in 1995 at Palermo.

1996
In 1996, Corretja faced Pete Sampras in an epic five-set quarterfinal match at the US Open. Pete Sampras threw up in the fifth set tiebreak
, where Corretja held a match point later on, but he eventually lost to Sampras on a double fault in 4 hours and 9 minutes.

1997
In 1997, Corretja captured three titles, including his first Tennis Masters Series title in Rome, where he defeated Marcelo Ríos. (He won a second Masters Series title in 2000 at Indian Wells.)

1998
1998 saw Corretja reach his first Grand Slam final at the French Open. In the third round, he defeated Argentina's Hernán Gumy in (at the time) the longest match in the tournament's history. Corretja won the 5-hour 31-minute marathon. In the final, Corretja lost to fellow-Spaniard Carlos Moyà in straight sets.

Corretja finished 1998 by winning the most significant title of his career, the ATP Tour World Championships. In the group stage, he beat world no. 5 Andre Agassi, and in the semifinals, Corretja saved three match points on the way to beating world no. 1 Sampras. In the final, Corretja faced world no. 4 Moyà in a five-set marathon and came back from two sets down to win in 4 hours and 1 minute. Corretja's win made him the first man to ever win the Tour Championships (in its 29-year history) without having ever won a Grand Slam tournament (David Nalbandian, Nikolay Davydenko, Grigor Dimitrov, Alexander Zverev and Stefanos Tsitsipas have since repeated the feat.)

In total, Corretja won a career-high five singles titles during the 1998 season, on three different surfaces (Clay, Hard and Carpet). He finished the year ranked world No. 3.

1999
Corretja reached three tournament finals, the quarterfinals of the French Open and reached his career high ranking of 2 in February.

2000
In 2000, Corretja won the Indian Wells Masters title, beating Thomas Enqvist in straight sets in the final. He also beat world no. 1 Agassi in the final of the Washington Open for the loss of just five games.

In the Davis Cup, Corretja helped Spain to their first ever title win. He went 3–0 in singles rubbers during the earlier rounds, and then teamed up with Joan Manuel Balcells to win the doubles match in the final as Spain beat Australia 3–1. Corretja also won a men's doubles bronze medal at the Olympic Games in Sydney, partnering Albert Costa.

2001
In 2001, Corretja reached the men's singles final at the French Open for the second time, losing in the final to defending champion Gustavo Kuerten in four sets. In July of that year, Corretja won a five-set marathon match in the final of the Dutch Open against Younes El Aynaoui. The 53-game match was the year's longest tour final.

2002
Corretja's biggest win of 2002 came in the quarterfinals of the Davis Cup, where he rallied from two sets down to beat Sampras on grass. (Spain eventually lost the tie 3–1.) At the French Open, Corretja saved four match points in the third round against Arnaud Clément, before going on to win. Corretja then progressed to the semifinals, where he lost in four sets to Albert Costa (who went on to win the title). One week later, Corretja was the best man at Costa's wedding.

2003-05
In 2003, Corretja was again part of a Spanish team which reached the Davis Cup final. He won two doubles and one singles rubber in the earlier rounds. However, in the final, Corretja and Feliciano López lost the doubles rubber, as Spain were beaten 3–1 by Australia.

Corretja announced his retirement on 24 September 2005. He won a total of 17 top-level singles titles and three doubles titles during his career.

After retirement
Corretja coached Britain's Andy Murray from 2008 to 2011.

As of 2015, he works for Eurosport as a field interviewer at the Grand Slam tournaments.

Career statistics

Performance timeline

Grand Slam finals

Singles: 2 (2 runner-ups)

Year-end championships finals

Singles: 1 (1 title)

Olympics medal matches

Doubles: 1 (1 bronze medal)

Masters Series finals

Singles: 5 (2 titles, 3 runner-ups)

References

External links

 
 
 

Tennis players from Catalonia
Olympic bronze medalists for Spain
Olympic medalists in tennis
Olympic tennis players of Spain
Spanish male tennis players
Tennis players from Barcelona
Tennis players at the 2000 Summer Olympics
1974 births
Living people
Medalists at the 2000 Summer Olympics
Spanish tennis coaches
Mediterranean Games silver medalists for Spain
Mediterranean Games medalists in tennis
Competitors at the 1991 Mediterranean Games